Beth A. Brown (February 4, 1969 – October 5, 2008) was a NASA astrophysicist with a research focus on X-ray observations of elliptical galaxies and black holes. She earned a Ph.D. in Astronomy from the University of Michigan in 1998, becoming the first African-American woman to do so.

Early life 
Brown was born in Roanoke, Virginia, in 1969. She loved Star Trek and Star Wars. She graduated from William Fleming High School in 1987 as valedictorian. When a high school assignment led her on a trip to an observatory, she saw the Ring Nebula through a telescope, which she cites as the moment she "got hooked on astronomy."

Education 
She studied astrophysics at Howard University, graduating  in 1991. During her undergraduate years, she completed two internships at NASA. While at Howard University, she played piccolo in several University bands, and she joined Tau Beta Sigma in fall 1990. She earned her M.S. and Ph.D. in astronomy from the University of Michigan by 1998. She was the first African-American woman to earn a Ph.D. from the University of Michigan's Department of Astronomy. While at the University of Michigan, she began her efforts at public outreach in astronomy, leading tours of the local planetarium and developing a one-credit course in naked eye astronomy for students with no experience in astronomy; the course continues to be taught and remains popular today. Her research there concerned X-ray observations of elliptical galaxies from the Röntgen Satellite.

Career and research 
Brown joined NASA's Goddard Space Flight Center (GSFC) as a post-doctoral research associate with the National Academy of Sciences/National Research Council. She became a post-doctoral research associate for the National Space Science Data Center (NSSDC) in 2001. She transferred to the X-ray Astrophysics Laboratory in 2005, providing support for the GSFC XMM Guest Observer Facility. She was hired as Assistant Director for Science Communication and Higher Education for the Sciences and Exploration Director at Goddard. She also completed a NASA Administrator Fellowship where she devoted a year to research with Dr. James Lindesay and taught classes with Dr. Demetrius Venable at Howard's Department of Physics and Astronomy. Brown served as the Administrative Executive Officer for National Society of Black Physicists (NSBP)  for two years and was involved with the National Conference of Black Physics Students (NCBPS).

Following her Ph.D., Beth Brown held a National Academy of Science & National Research Council Postdoctoral Research Fellowship at NASA's Goddard Space Flight Center. Subsequently, she served at the National Space Science Data Center at Goddard, where she was involved in data archival activities as well as education and outreach.  In 2006, Brown became an Astrophysics Fellow at Goddard, during which time she worked as a visiting Assistant Professor at Howard University. At Goddard, she was NSSDC's primary interface to such Science Archive Research Centers (SARCs) as the High Energy Astrophysics SARC at Goddard, the Multi-Mission Archive at STScI (MAST) and the Infrared Science Archive (IRSA) at Caltech. She also helped to "rationalize" NSSDC's legacy holdings of astrophysics data in light of data supported at the SARCs which are also to be permanently archived at NSSDC. At the time of her death, she was looking forward to a new position at GSFC as the Assistant Director for Science Communications and Higher Education.

Awards and honors 
The American Astronomical Society has an award in her honor for a students with poster or oral presentations at the annual National Society of Black Physicists meeting. She is featured in the book, Women of Goddard: Careers in Science, Technology, Engineering & Mathematics.

Death 
Brown died unexpectedly on October 5, 2008 at the age of 39 from a pulmonary embolism.

References

External links
 Tribute video for Beth Brown, her work and life from childhood
American Physical Society, Physicists Profile 
NSBP honors Dr. Beth Brown 
Howard University documentary on her life, Part I and Part II

1969 births
2008 deaths
African-American women scientists
American astrophysicists
Howard University alumni
NASA people
People from Roanoke, Virginia
University of Michigan College of Literature, Science, and the Arts alumni
Scientists from Virginia